This is a list of winners and nominees of the South Indian International Movie Awards for Best Actor in the Malayalam film(s). The first recipient of this award was Mohanlal received at the 1st South Indian International Movie Awards held on 22 June 2012 in Dubai.

Superlatives

Special recognition
Most Popular Actor in Middil East Award For Mohanlal

Winners and nominations

See also 
 SIIMA for Best Actress – Malayalam
 SIIMA for Best Film – Malayalam

References

Best Actor Malayalam
Awards for male actors